The Hoodoo River is a tributary of the Iskut River in the northwest part of the province of British Columbia, Canada, located west of Hoodoo Mountain and the Twin River in Cassiar Land District.

The river's watershed's land cover is classified as 49.4% snow/glacier, 22.7% barren, 10.6% conifer forest, 9.8% shrubland, and small amounts of other cover.

The Hoodoo River is in the traditional territory of the Tlingit, specifically the Shtax'héen Ḵwáan, commonly known as the Stikine River people. It is also in the asserted traditional territory of the Tahltan First Nation and Iskut First Nation, of the Tahltan people.

Geography
The Hoodoo River originates from the meltwaters of Hoodoo Glacier, a valley glacier that flows from the Andrei Icefield which dominates the mountains north of the Hoodoo River and from which numerous glaciers extend in all directions. This large glacial field is named after the son of Olav Mokievsky-Zubok, a glaciologist who carried out significant glaciological work in the Coast Mountains from the 1960s to the 1970s.

From Hoodoo Glacier the Hoodoo River flows south along the west side of Hoodoo Mountain and through glacial meltwater lakes, then through a coastal western hemlock forest. From this confluence of the two forks, the Hoodoo River continues south through an increasingly braided channel before emptying into the Iskut River.

See also
 List of British Columbia rivers

References 

Cassiar Land District
Rivers of British Columbia
Rivers of the Boundary Ranges
Stikine Country
Tahltan
Tlingit